Thomas Foster (July 24, 1852 – December 10, 1945) was the Mayor of Toronto, Ontario, Canada from 1925 to 1927.

Early life
The son of John T. Foster and Frances Nicholson, Thomas Foster was born July 24, 1852, in Lambton Mills, Ontario. His family soon moved to Leaskdale, Ontario after his mother's death.

He started his working life as a butcher's boy in Toronto, until he saved enough money to purchase his own butcher shop for $50. The earnings from that business allowed him to purchase property which became the source of his eventual wealth.

Political career
He was first elected as an alderman for St. David Ward in 1891, then reelected in 1892 and 1894. In 1895 he lost the election, and did not return to council until 1900 as an alderman for Ward 2, a position which he held until 1909. He was elected to the Toronto Board of Control in 1910; however, he lost the 1911 election. In 1912 he was again elected Controller and kept his seat until 1917.

Foster served as a Member of House of Commons of Canada from 1917 to 1921. He was elected as a Union Government candidate in the 1917 federal election for East York. He lost in his party's nomination so he ran as an independent in Toronto East in the 1921 election but failed to keep his seat.

Foster returned to City Council for the next three years, then was elected as mayor in 1925. He was a great supporter of Hydro expenditures and loved flowers. As an alderman he fought for the rebuilding of the pavilion at Allan Gardens after it had been destroyed by fire. In his 25 years of civic service he earned the informal title of "Honest Tom". As mayor of Toronto he was reported to have saved the city two million dollars by rigid economics. 

Foster was known to collect the rents on his properties in person, even when he was mayor. If a tenant complained about a problem, or wanted a bit of work done, Foster would go out to his car, get his tools and fix the issue on the spot. His penny pinching eventually led to his defeat due to his refusal to raise police salaries.

Later years and legacy
He was a great traveler and on one of his trips he was inspired by the Taj Mahal. In 1935 and 1936 he had a memorial temple constructed on a hill between Leaskdale and Uxbridge, Ontario, for his family at a cost of $200,000. The temple was designed by Foster with architects H.H. Madill and James H. Craig and inspired by Mughal architecture and Byzantine architecture.

He died at the age of 93 and is buried in the massive mausoleum on a hill north of town on Durham Regional Road 1 which includes the remains of Foster, his wife and daughter. Foster left $80,000 in funds to maintain the property in perpetuity but the trustees spent the principal and the funds had dried up by the 1990s, leaving the Town of Uxbridge to take over responsibility for the monument. In 2013, it was estimated that $1 million was needed to repair and restore the building, a controversial task given that the entire budget for the municipality was only $14 million.

Among other things, Foster left $500,000 for cancer research, $100,000 for an annual picnic to be held at Exhibition Park for school children, and funds to feed wild birds in Toronto. Inspired by the Great Stork Derby, Mayor Foster also sponsored a contest to reward mothers for their skills at procreation. The prizes were $1,250 for first, $800 for second, and $450 for third. Four ten-years periods began and ended on his death date, and ran from 1945–55, 1948–58, 1951–61, and 1954-64.

A bronze portrait medallion of Thomas Foster by Christian Corbet was publicly unveiled in 2009 and is permanently housed in the memorial.

He was also a member of the Orange Order in Canada.

Electoral record

Municipal
 Alderman for St. David's Ward (1891–1892, 1894)
 Alderman for Ward 2 (1900–1909)
 Toronto Board of Control (1910, 1912–1913, 1915–1917, 1922–1924)
 Mayor of Toronto (1925-1927)

Federal

Further reading
Toronto Star, Dec 11, 1945 and the Toronto Globe and Mail, December 12, 1945

References

External links 
 
 Thomas Foster memorial in Scott Township
 Thomas Foster Memorial

1852 births
1945 deaths
Members of the House of Commons of Canada from Ontario
Unionist Party (Canada) MPs
Mayors of Toronto